The 1816 United States presidential election in Connecticut took place between November 1 to December 4, 1816, as part of the 1816 United States presidential election. The state legislature chose nine representatives, or electors to the Electoral College, who voted for President and Vice President.

During this election, Connecticut cast its nine electoral votes to Federalist Party candidate Rufus King of New York. Nevertheless, Democratic Republican candidate and Secretary of State James Monroe won the election nationally. 

With King's victory in the state, Connecticut became one of only three states to vote for the Federalists, with the other two being neighboring Massachusetts and Delaware.

Although John Eager Howard was selected as King's running mate, Connecticut split its votes for Vice President between James Ross of Pennsylvania and Chief Justice John Marshall.

As of 2022, this is the most recent election where electors were chosen by the state legislature rather than the popular vote in Connecticut.

See also
 United States presidential elections in Connecticut

References

Connecticut
1816
1816 Connecticut elections